Francis Gibson (1805-1858), was a British banker and businessman.

Early life
He was born in Saffron Walden, Essex, the son  of the banker Atkinson Francis Gibson (1763-1829).

Career
Soon after his marriage, Gibson became a director of the Stockton and Darlington Railway. Soon afterwards, he was one of the four Quaker founders of Middlesbrough.

Although still base in Saffron Walden, Gibson and his wife spent two months every summer in County Durham and bought a house there, Balder Grange, in 1843. The Victorian house is close to Cotherstone and overlooks the River Balder.

Personal life
On 7 May 1829, he married Elizabeth Pease, the youngest daughter of Edward Pease, "the father of the railways". He enjoyed painting and, late in life, he built the Fry Art Gallery (1856), in Saffron Walden.

They had two children:
Elizabeth Pease Gibson (1830-1870). She married the Quaker lawyer, politician and philanthropist Lewis Fry (1832-1921)
Francis Edward Gibson (1831-1862). He died of apoplexy in Florence, Italy.

References

1805 births
1858 deaths
British bankers
British Quakers
Francis
People from Saffron Walden
19th-century British businesspeople